Maciej Jachowski (born 8 July 1977) is a Polish actor and singer.

Career 

His TV debut was in the dramatic documentary telenovela Sekcja 998 (TVP2, 2006). In the TVP2 soap opera M jak miłość, Jachowski plays Irek Podleśny, a colleague of Olga (Karolina Nowakowska). He has appeared in 39 i pół (TVN, 2009), Samo Życie (Polsat, 2009), and Na dobre i na złe (TVP2, 2010). In the soap opera Na Wspólnej (TVN, 2010), Jachowski plays the role of Piotr Czubak. He played the role of Krzysztof in the feature film Fenomen (2010).

Jachowski participated in the fifth edition of the Polsat entertainment show Jak oni śpiewają (2009), in which he finished in second place. He later appeared in the show's sixth edition titled Pojedynek Mistrzów (2010).

He participated in the twelfth edition of Taniec z gwiazdami, finishing last (14th place) with dance partner Janja Lesar.

Filmography

References

External links 
 Maciej Jachowski's Official Web site
 

1977 births
Living people
Polish male actors